The 2017 FIM CEV Moto3 Junior World Championship was the sixth CEV Moto3 season and the fourth under the FIM banner.

Calendar
The following races were scheduled to take place in 2017.

Entry list

Championship standings

Scoring system
Points are awarded to the top fifteen finishers. A rider has to finish the race to earn points.

Riders' championship

Constructors' championship

References

External links

2017
2017 in motorcycle sport